The Bissell Bridge is a historic covered bridge on Heath Road (Massachusetts Route 8A) over Mill Brook in Charlemont, Massachusetts. The TECO Enhanced Long through truss bridge was built in 1951 by the T. J. Harvey Company, to a design by the Timber Engineering Company (TECO) and the Massachusetts Department of Transportation (DOT). Mill Brook passes fifteen to twenty feet below the bridge at normal water levels. It was the first covered bridge to be built in Massachusetts in the 20th century, replacing an earlier covered bridge that dated to about 1881.

The bridge is sited near an old mill dam and pond, and is not far (about ) from the house of Henry W. Bissell, for whom it is named.  The town appropriated $1000 for its construction in 1880, and it is assumed to have been built not long afterward.  By the mid 20th century the bridge was deteriorating, and the DOT condemned it.  The town vehemently opposed the construction of a modern steel-and-concrete structure as its replacement, and the matter drew a great deal of media attention.  The design that resulted from the decision-making process was a near replica of the original bridge.  It was built at a cost (shared by all levels of government) of $50,000 to $55,000.  The only major deviations from the original design were made to accommodate modern roadway requirements.  By the end of the 20th century, the new bridge was also deteriorating, and was closed and rehabilitated.  The bridge was added to the National Register of Historic Places in 2004.

References

Road bridges on the National Register of Historic Places in Massachusetts
Bridges in Franklin County, Massachusetts
National Register of Historic Places in Franklin County, Massachusetts
1951 establishments in Massachusetts
Wooden bridges in Massachusetts
Covered bridges on the National Register of Historic Places in Massachusetts
Truss bridges in the United States